Vijay N. Gupchup (born 1937) is an educationist, academician, researcher and considered an expert in the field of civil engineering and structural engineering.

Education
Gupchup obtained the Bachelor of Engineering degree in civil engineering from VJTI, University of Bombay in 1958 and the Master of Science and Doctor of Science degrees in civil engineering in 1959 and 1963 respectively, from the Massachusetts Institute of Technology (MIT) in the US.

Career
Gupchup was a professor at the Veermata Jijabai Technological Institute (formerly known as Victoria Jubilee Technical Institute) in Mumbai. He held the post of the Principal of VJTI from January 1983 to June 1992 and May 1995 to January 1997, when Dr. Gupchup retired after spending nearly three decades in the field of Technical Education.

Gupchup was the Pro Vice Chancellor of the University of Mumbai from June 1992 to May 1995. He was also the Chairman of the 'National Board of Accreditation' set up by the All India Council for Technical Education in India from July 2000 till June 2003.

Contribution
Gupchup has been active in the field of Technical Education for more than thirty five years and has provided leadership in this field in the State of Maharashtra. He has contributed to various aspects of the development of Technical Education at the National level through his association with the All India Council for Technical education and the University Grants Commission. He has authored numerous technical papers and has also presented invited lectures at several universities in the US, including Massachusetts Institute Of Technology (MIT), Northwestern University, Drexel University, Kansas State University, Texas State University, And Southern Illinois University - Edwardsville.

Activities
Gupchup continues to be an active member on various academic bodies of the University of Mumbai, AICTE and UGC. He is also a director on several company boards and consults on a wide range of academic and engineering areas. He has been a non-executive independent director of Ion Exchange (India) Ltd since 17 July 1995. Gupchup has been director of Walchand Peoplefirst Ltd since 10 May 2010. He is a member of the VJTI Alumni committee. He also serves as member of the board of governors of academic institutions including Dr. Babasaheb Ambedkar Technological University, Lonere and Vidyalankar Institute of Technology, Mumbai.

References

Living people
Academic staff of Veermata Jijabai Technological Institute
1937 births